Keating is an unincorporated community in East Keating Township, Clinton County, Pennsylvania, United States.

References

Unincorporated communities in Pennsylvania
Unincorporated communities in Clinton County, Pennsylvania